Transmembrane activator and CAML interactor (TACI), also known as tumor necrosis factor receptor superfamily member 13B (TNFRSF13B) is a protein that in humans is encoded by the TNFRSF13B gene.

TNFRSF13B  is a transmembrane protein of the TNF receptor superfamily found predominantly on the surface of B cells, which are an important part of the immune system. TACI recognizes three ligands: APRIL, BAFF and CAML.

Function 

TACI is a lymphocyte-specific member of the tumor necrosis factor (TNF) receptor superfamily. It was originally discovered because of its ability to interact with calcium-modulator and cyclophilin ligand (CAML). TACI was later found to play a crucial role in humoral immunity by interacting with two members of the TNF family: BAFF and APRIL. These proteins signal through TACI inducing activation of several transcription factors including NFAT, AP-1, and NF-kappa-B which then modulate cellular activities. Defects in the function of TACI can lead to immune system diseases and has shown to cause fatal autoimmunity in mice.

TACI controls T cell-independent B cell antibody responses, isotype switching, and B cell homeostasis.

Clinical significance 

TACI mutations are associated with immunodeficiency in humans, as a significant proportion of CVID patients have TACI mutations. People with this condition produce abnormally low amounts of antibodies, which are needed for protection against infections.

In humans, the gene encoding this protein is located within the Smith-Magenis syndrome region on chromosome 17.

TACI is currently being targeted for autoimmunity and B cell malignancies via atacicept, a recombinant fusion protein that binds the TACI ligands BAFF and APRIL.

Interactions 

TNFRSF13B has been shown to interact with B-cell activating factor, TRAF6, TRAF5, TNFSF13, TRAF2 and CAMLG.

References

Further reading 

 
 
 
 
 
 
 
 
 
 
 
 
 
 
 
 
 
 

Clusters of differentiation
TNF receptor family